Aion or AION may refer to:

Arts, entertainment, and media

Literature
 Aion (manga), a 2008 manga by Yuna Kagesaki
 AION Linguistica, a linguistic journal
 Aion: Researches into the Phenomenology of the Self, a book by Carl Jung

Music
 Aiōn, orchestral composition by Anna S. Þorvaldsdóttir
 Aion (Japanese band), a Japanese metal band
 Aion (Aion album), their 1992 album
 Aion (CMX album), a 2003 album by CMX
 Aion (Dead Can Dance album), a 1990 album by Dead Can Dance

Other
 Aion (Chrono Crusade), the main villain of the anime series Chrono Crusade
 Aion (video game), a 2008 Korean multiplayer online game by NCsoft

Businesses and organizations
 Aion (car brand), a Chinese electric vehicle brand by GAC Group
 Aion Bank, a Belgian full-service digital bank

Mythology
 Greek αἰών "time, eternity; age"; see Aeon
 Aion (deity), "Aeon" personified in Hellenistic religion
 Aeon (Gnosticism), one of the Gnostic terms for "emanations of God"

Science and technology
 Anterior ischemic optic neuropathy (AION), a medical condition involving loss of vision
 Cleverpath AION Business Rules Expert, a programming language, originally AION

Other uses
 Aion language, a Ramu language of Papua New Guinea
 House of Aion, an ancient Roman villa that is part of the Paphos Archaeological Park

See also
 Aeon (disambiguation)
 Alon (disambiguation)
 Aon (disambiguation)
 Eon (disambiguation)
 Ion (disambiguation)